Braver Angels (formerly Better Angels) is a New York-based 501(c)(3) nonprofit dedicated to political depolarization. The organization runs workshops, debates, and other events where "red" (conservative) and "blue" (liberal) participants attempt to better understand one another's positions and discover their shared values. Its stated mission is to bring Americans together to bridge the partisan divide and strengthen our democratic republic.

Founding
Braver Angels was founded by David Blankenhorn, Bill Doherty, and David Lapp shortly after the 2016 presidential election.

The organization's original Better Angels name was inspired by Lincoln's plea for national unity at the close of his first inaugural address. The name was changed to Braver Angels in 2020 pursuant to a trademark infringement suit.

Leadership
David Blankenhorn is the president of Braver Angels. Prior to Braver Angels, Blankenhorn worked to prevent the legalization of gay marriage; in 2012, he announced that he continues to believe gay marriage is morally wrong, but is in favor of its legalization as a political compromise.

John Wood Jr. is the Director of Media Development at Braver Angels. He produces the Braver Angels podcast and Youtube channel. He is a Republican politician.

Podcast
The Braver Angels Podcast began in 2017, hosted by a rotating group of Braver Angels leaders including David Blankenhorn, John Wood Jr., Alma Cook, April Lawson, Ciaran O'Connor, and Mónica Guzmán. Past guests have included Bill Kristol, James Comey, Scott Adams, Jonathan Haidt, Coleman Hughes, Hawk Newsome, Carol M. Swain, and Greta Van Susteren.

References

External links

Organizations based in New York City
501(c)(3) organizations